Robert Page Sewell (3 September 1866 – 7 February 1901) was an English first-class cricketer active 1884–95 who played for Kent. He was born in Maldon and died in Surbiton.

References

1866 births
1901 deaths
English cricketers
Kent cricketers
R. S. Lucas' XI cricketers